Hate Thy Neighbor is a Viceland series featuring Jamali Maddix. In the documentary, Maddix goes on tour and interviews members of highly-controversial groups such as NSM, Azov, and Nordic Youth.

Series overview

Episode list

Season 1 (2017)

Season 2 (2018)

References

2010s American mockumentary television series
2017 American television series debuts
2018 American television series endings